Gafatasi Su'a (born 21 January 1992) is a New Zealand rugby union footballer who currently plays as a hooker for  in the ITM Cup.

Su'a was a New Zealand Schools representative in 2010 and also played in both the Blues & Chiefs Development sides.

References

1992 births
Living people
New Zealand rugby union players
Rugby union hookers
Auckland rugby union players
Counties Manukau rugby union players
Rugby union players from Auckland
People educated at Mount Albert Grammar School